La Force is a commune in the Aude department, southern France.

It is recognised as the smallest circulade or circular village in France.

The maire in 2020 is Jean Marc Albert Georges Estrem.

Population

See also
Communes of the Aude department

References

Communes of Aude
Aude communes articles needing translation from French Wikipedia